The Shelton-Lockeby House is a historic house in rural Pike County, Arkansas. The house is a dogtrot built in 1905 by Jim Lockeby. The house has been little altered since its construction, and is supplied with electricity but not running water. The only major addition has been kitchen cabinets. It is the best-preserved form of this type of house in the county.

The house, along with its surrounding , was listed on the National Register of Historic Places in 2005.

See also
National Register of Historic Places listings in Pike County, Arkansas

References

Houses on the National Register of Historic Places in Arkansas
Houses completed in 1905
Houses in Pike County, Arkansas
National Register of Historic Places in Pike County, Arkansas
1905 establishments in Arkansas
Dogtrot architecture in Arkansas